Ingimundur Ingimundarson (born 29 January 1980) is an Icelandic handball player who played for Íþróttafélag Reykjavíkur in the N1-deild. In June 2008 he was able to leave the Norwegian side Elverum Håndball on free transfer due to a misunderstanding when he agreed to sign a new contract, but never signed it. He then chose to play for GWD Minden from Germany. After coming back to Iceland he joined Fram. After a season at Fram he joined his childhood team, ÍR.

He was part of the Icelandic team that won the silver medal at the 2008 Summer Olympics, and also represented Iceland at the 2012 Summer Olympics.

References

External links
 Ingimundur Ingimundarsons profile at gwd-minden.de

 

Ingimundarson, Ingimundur
Ingimundarson, Ingimundur
Icelandic male handball players
Ingimundarson, Ingimundur
Ingimundarson, Ingimundur
Olympic handball players of Iceland
Olympic silver medalists for Iceland
Recipients of the Order of the Falcon
Aalborg Håndbold players
Ingimundarson, Ingimundur
Ingimundarson, Ingimundur